"Out Here Grindin" is the first single from DJ Khaled's third studio album, We Global. The track features American hip hop artists Akon, Rick Ross, Young Jeezy, Lil Boosie, Trick Daddy, Ace Hood and Plies. It was produced by The Runners and co-produced by Akon, with the hook written by T-Pain.

Background
This song originally featured Lil Wayne in place of Young Jeezy. The version with Young Jeezy in place of Wayne is the official single version. Plies' verse has been moved to Wayne's part. The version with Jeezy's verse was released on Jeezy's mixtape "The Prime Minister". The reason for Wayne's verse being removed is allegedly because of him not being able to attend the music video shoot.

Versions
The song has three versions.
Out Here Grindin (Original Version)(DJ Khaled featuring Akon, Rick Ross, Plies, Lil Boosie, Trick Daddy, Ace Hood and Lil Wayne)
Out Here Grindin (Single Version)(DJ Khaled featuring Akon, Rick Ross, Young Jeezy, Lil Boosie, Trick Daddy, Ace Hood and Plies)
Out Here Grindin (Video & Album Version)(DJ Khaled featuring Akon, Rick Ross, Plies, Lil Boosie, Ace Hood and Trick Daddy)

A fourth version, available on the Lil Wayne and Friends 4 mixtape, removes Plies' verse and instead features both Jeezy and Wayne's parts. It is credited as Lil Wayne feat. Young Jeezy.

Music video
A music video was filmed in 2008 and features all the guest artists working with green screens. Cameos were made by Tyga, Bun B, Young Dro, Fat Joe, Red Cafe, Brisco, Lil Mama, Flo Rida, Busta Rhymes, Maino, Kardinal Offishall, Royce Da 5'9, Sean Kingston, and T-Pain. The video premiered on MTV2's Sucker Free on July 22, 2008. The video does not include Young Jeezy, but he is still kept on the official single. The video version has Akon, Rick Ross, Plies, Lil Boosie, Ace Hood and Trick Daddy, and is the version that ended up being on the album.

Chart performance
"Out Here Grindin" first made a "Hot Shot Debut" at number 38 on the US Billboard Hot 100 chart for the issue of July 19, 2008 making it DJ Khaled's highest debut on the chart at the time. On January 13, 2009, the single was certified gold by the Recording Industry Association of America (RIAA) for sales of over 500,000 copies.

Also, in Canada it debuted at number 71 on the Canadian Hot 100 based on downloads.

Charts

Certifications

References

2008 singles
DJ Khaled songs
Akon songs
Rick Ross songs
Plies (rapper) songs
Lil Boosie songs
Ace Hood songs
Trick Daddy songs
Jeezy songs
Songs written by Akon
Songs written by Ace Hood
Songs written by Trick Daddy
Song recordings produced by Akon
Songs written by Jeezy
Music videos directed by Gil Green
Songs written by Rick Ross
Song recordings produced by the Runners
Gangsta rap songs
Songs written by DJ Khaled
2008 songs
Songs written by Plies (rapper)
Songs written by T-Pain
MNRK Music Group singles